Mallal N'Diaye (born 4 January 1971) is a retired Malian football striker.

Career statistics

International

Statistics accurate as of match played 10 October 2004

References

1971 births
Living people
Malian footballers
Mali international footballers
FC Pyunik players
FC Yerevan players
FC Lausanne-Sport players
Djoliba AC players
Association football forwards
Malian expatriate footballers
Expatriate footballers in Armenia
Malian expatriate sportspeople in Armenia
Expatriate footballers in Switzerland
Malian expatriate sportspeople in Switzerland
21st-century Malian people